In mathematics, a monogenic field is an algebraic number field K for which there exists an element a such that the ring of integers OK is the subring Z[a] of K generated by a. Then OK is a quotient of the polynomial ring Z[X] and the powers of a constitute a power integral basis.

In a monogenic field K, the field discriminant of K is equal to the discriminant of the minimal polynomial of α.

Examples
Examples of monogenic fields include:
 Quadratic fields:
 if  with  a square-free integer, then  where  if d ≡ 1 (mod 4) and  if d ≡ 2 or 3 (mod 4).
 Cyclotomic fields:
 if  with  a root of unity, then  Also the maximal real subfield  is monogenic, with ring of integers .

While all quadratic fields are monogenic, already among cubic fields there are many that are not monogenic. The first example of a non-monogenic number field that was found is the cubic field generated by a root of the polynomial , due to Richard Dedekind.

References
 
 

Algebraic number theory